Gary Thomas Mulligan (born 23 April 1985) is an Irish footballer who plays as a forward for  club Harborough Town.

Coming through the Wolverhampton Wanderers academy in 2004, and played on loan at Rushden & Diamonds, before he joined Sheffield United the following year. He did not make a first team appearance for the "Blades", and instead was loaned out to Port Vale and Gillingham. In 2006, he transferred to Gillingham on a permanent basis, where he remained for three years before joining Northampton Town. In 2010, he joined non-league Gateshead. He signed with Brackley Town in February 2012, and helped the club to the Southern League title in 2011–12. In 2015, he signed for Kettering Town via Dunstable Town, and helped Kettering to win the Southern  League Division One Central title in 2014–15 and then successive Hillier Cup titles in 2017 and 2018. He signed with Corby Town in June 2018 and served as joint-caretaker manager the following year. He signed with Harborough Town in March 2022 and helped the club to win the United Counties League Premier Division South title at the end of the 2021–22 season.

Career

Wolverhampton Wanderers
Born in Dublin, Mulligan played his youth football at Belvedere before moving on to Wolverhampton Wanderers, for whom he made only one appearance, as an 82nd minute substitute in the 1–1 draw with Burnley at Turf Moor on 21 August 2004. Wolves sent him on loan to Rushden & Diamonds in October that year. Mulligan made his debut for Diamonds, again as a substitute, in the 1–0 home defeat to Chester City, and made his first start, and scored his first goal, in their next match, a 1–1 draw away to Wycombe Wanderers. He scored three goals in twelve games for Rushden & Diamonds, but was released by his parent club at the end of the season.

Sheffield United
Mulligan was signed by Sheffield United in July 2005. He only made two appearances for them in the League Cup as chances at Bramall Lane were limited. In the 2005–06 season he went on loan to Port Vale for a month, which was extended by four weeks in October, and again in November, scoring once (against Walsall) in twelve games.

Gillingham
In January, he joined Vale's League One rivals Gillingham. He spent a month on the sidelines with ligament damage, which at first was feared to be a broken leg. Following his recovery he was back in the Gills' first team and remained so until the end of the season. He scored one goal in thirteen appearances for the "Gills".

His hard-working style had impressed Gillingham manager Ronnie Jepson and on 12 May 2006 he signed for Gillingham on a permanent basis. With 42 games to his credit in 2006–07, he was third in the club's player of the year voting behind Andrew Crofts and Mark Bentley. Following Mark Stimson's appointment in November 2007, Mulligan dropped out of first team plans as the Gills sunk to relegation in 2007–08. His five goals fell way short of the target of 15–20 he had set himself. He admitted he considered switching to another club, though eventually he decided to stick with the Kent club, agreeing a one-year deal in June 2008. He kicked off the 2008–09 season with a goal against AFC Bournemouth, though did not believe this would mean a return in the first 11. Indeed, he scored just two goals in 31 games over the rest of the season, and he was released in the summer.

Northampton Town
He joined Northampton Town on a one-year deal in July 2009.

He was released by the club in May 2010, along with five other players.

Non-league
In August 2010, Mulligan joined Gateshead on an initial five-month deal, making his debut against Kettering Town on 14 August. Mulligan scored his first goal for Gateshead on 21 August, away at Forest Green Rovers. On 23 December 2010, Gateshead extended Mulligan's contract until the end of the season. It was announced on 20 December 2011 that Mulligan would be released on 1 January 2012, at the end of his contract.

In February 2012, Mulligan joined Brackley Town. He made his debut on 21 February as a late substitute in a 2–1 win against Barwell. He played 12 games as the "Saints" won promotion was champions of the Southern League title in 2011–12. He helped the club to the Conference North play-off final at the end of the 2012–13 season, where they were beaten 1–0 by F.C. Halifax Town. He made 31 appearances in the 2013–14 campaign.

In February 2015 he signed with Southern League club Kettering Town after moving from Dunstable Town. The "Poppies" won promotion as champions of Division One Central in 2014–15 and finished sixth and then ninth in the Premier Division in 2015–16, with Mulligan scoring three goals from 45 matches in the latter campaign. Kettering again finished sixth in the 2016–17 season as Mulligan featured 47 times, including an appearance in the final of the Hillier Cup where Kettering beat Corby Town after a penalty shoot-out. He made 49 appearances across the 2017–18 campaign as Marcus Law led the side to a fourth-place finish and defeat in the play-off semi-finals to Slough Town. They also retained the Hillier Cup after beating Brackley Town 2–1 in the final.

On 28 June 2018, Mulligan signed with Southern League Division One Central side Corby Town and was immediately named club captain by manager Steven Kinniburgh, who was a former Kettering teammate. He made 43 appearances over the course of the 2018–19 season, helping the "Steelmen" to a third-place finish and a place in the play-offs. Corby went on to reach the play-off final, but were beaten 4–3 by Bromsgrove Sporting after extra-time. He and Ash Robinson stepped up to the post of joint-caretaker managers following Kinniburgh's resignation in July 2019. They stayed in the role until the appointment of Mark Peters on 28 February, at which point Mulligan remained in a playing capacity. He made 28 appearances in the 2019–20 season, which was abandoned due to the COVID-19 pandemic in England, and again he confirmed he would be staying on at the club in June. He featured eleven times in the 2020–21 season, which was also curtailed early due to the ongoing pandemic.

On 7 March 2022, Mulligan joined United Counties League Premier Division South side Harborough Town. He helped the "Bees" to win the United Counties League Premier Division South title at the end of the 2021–22 season.

Career statistics

A.  The "League" column constitutes appearances and goals (including those as a substitute) in the English Football League and Conference.
B.  The "Other" column constitutes appearances and goals (including those as a substitute) in the FA Trophy, League Trophy, play-offs and Hillier Cup.

Honours
Brackley Town
Southern League: 2011–12

Kettering Town
Southern League Division One Central: 2014–15
Hillier Cup: 2017 & 2018

Harborough Town
United Counties League Premier Division South: 2021–22

References

1985 births
Living people
Association footballers from Dublin (city)
Republic of Ireland association footballers
Association football forwards
Belvedere F.C. players
Wolverhampton Wanderers F.C. players
Rushden & Diamonds F.C. players
Sheffield United F.C. players
Port Vale F.C. players
Gillingham F.C. players
Northampton Town F.C. players
Gateshead F.C. players
Brackley Town F.C. players
Dunstable Town F.C. players
Kettering Town F.C. players
Corby Town F.C. players
Harborough Town F.C. players
English Football League players
National League (English football) players
Southern Football League players
United Counties League players
Republic of Ireland expatriate association footballers
Expatriate footballers in England
Republic of Ireland football managers
Corby Town F.C. managers
Southern Football League managers
Republic of Ireland expatriate football managers